The Brooks Quimby Debate Council is a debating society in the city of Lewiston, Maine, whose membership is drawn primarily from Bates College. The debate society is often contrasted with the University of Oxford's Oxford Union as both have been described as "the playground of the powerful." Oxford's first debate in the United States was against Bates in Lewiston, Maine, in September 1923. The debate society competes in the British and American Parliamentary Styles. It competes in the American Parliamentary Debate Association domestically, and competes in the World Universities Debating Championships, internationally.

At the 2017 World Universities Debating Championships in the Hague, Netherlands the council advanced the final round, becoming one of the top four teams in the world. As of 2013, the debate council was ranked 5th, nationally. In 2012, the debate team was ranked 9th in the world. In 1922, The New York Times called Bates "the power centre of college debating in America." Founded near the start of the college's founding, the debate society is the oldest coeducational collegiate debating society in the United States.

History 
The formation of the team predates the establishment of the college itself as the debate society was founded within the Maine State Seminary. Professor Jonathan Stanton, who taught at Bates from 1863 to 1918, was instrumental in encouraging the early debate societies at Bates in the 1860s and the sophomore debate prize. In 1869 the State of Maine gave separate charters to two of Bates' first debating and literary societies, the  Polymnian Society and Eurosophian Society. As early as the 1870s, women were participating the debate contests at Bates. From 1901 to 1903 William Trufant Foster led the Bates debate program. Bates' debate society was eventually headed by Bates alumnus and teacher Brooks Quimby, Class of 1918, and became the first intercollegiate international debate team in the United States. Quimby Debate Society has been noted as "America's most prestigious debating society." During the 1930s, the debate society was subject to 'The Quimby Institute' which pitted each and every debate student against Brooks Quimby himself. This is where he began to engage heated debate with them that stressed "flawless assertions" and resulted in every error made by the student to be carefully scrutinized and teased.
During the Chase presidency, the college's debate team became intercollegiate and associated with the college's academic reputation. The debate society became the first college debate team in the United States to compete internationally.

In February 1920, the debate team defeated Harvard College during the national debate tournament held at Lewiston City Hall. After this, Bates was established as a dominant force in collegiate debate. In 1921, the college's debate team participated in the first intercontinental collegiate debate in history against the Oxford Union's debate team at the University of Oxford. 

In 1922, The New York Times called Bates "the power centre of college debating in America." Oxford's first debate in the United States was against Bates in Lewiston, Maine, in September 1923.

Membership and status 
It competes in the American Parliamentary Debate Association domestically, and competes in the World Universities Debating Championships, internationally. In 2014, the council won US Nationals at the US Universities Debating Championship.
As of 2013, the debate council was ranked 5th, nationally. In 2012, the debate team was ranked 9th in the world.

Notable alumni 

 U.S. Secretary of State Edmund Muskie
 U.S. Assistant Secretary of State for African Affairs Constance Berry Newman
 Civil rights leader Benjamin Mays
 U.S. Governor Carl Miliken
 U.S. Minister to Columbia John Abbott
 U.S. Representative John Swasey
 U.S. Representative Carroll Beedy
 U.S. Representative Charles Clason
 U.S. Representative Donald Partridge
 U.S. Representative Frank Coffin
 U.S. Representative Leo Ryan
 U.S. Representative Robert Goodlatte
 U.S. Representative Ben Cline
 Chief Justice of the Maine Supreme Court Scott Wilson
 Chief Justice of the Maine Supreme Court Albert Spear
 Chief Justice of the Maine Supreme Court Vincent McKusick
 Associate Justice of the Maine Supreme Court Enoch Foster
 Associate Justice of the Maine Supreme Court Randolph Weatherbee
 Associate Justice of the Maine Supreme Court David Nichols
 Associate Justice of the Maine Supreme Court Louis Scolnick
 Associate Justice of the Maine Supreme Court Morton Brody
 Maine State Senate Majority Leader Nate Libby
 State Senator George Edwin Smith
 State Senator Henry Chandler
 State Senator Jeffrey Butland
 State Senator Kevin Raye
 State Senator Gerald Davis
 State Representative Sawin Millett
 State Representative Jeffrey Roy
 State Representative Marianne Brenton
 Mayor of San Francisco Art Agnos
 Mayor of Auburn, Lewiston John Jenkins
United States Attorney for Alabama Joyce White Vance

See also 
 Oxford Union, debating society in Oxford, England

References 

Bates College
Student debating societies
Youth organizations based in Maine